David Newton (born 2 February 1958) is a Scottish jazz pianist, composer, arranger and educator.

Early life
Newton was born in Glasgow on 2 February 1958. He "played clarinet, bassoon and piano before specializing on piano at the Leeds School of Music".

Later life and career
Newton had a trio in Bradford in 1978 and worked in a theatre in Scarborough. He returned to Scotland in the early 1980s. He "established a considerable reputation as an accompanist to visiting American musicians before he launched his own solo career". In 1986, he made his recording debut, with Buddy DeFranco. He moved to London the following year, "worked with Alan Barnes, then toured with Martin Taylor's Quartet (including [a] trip to India) from 1989 to 1991." He was vocalist Carol Kidd's musical director in the 1990s. He also accompanied several other singers.

Newton recorded three albums as a leader for Linn Records in the early 1990s: the trio records Eyewitness and Victim of Circumstance, and the solo piano Return Journey. He then moved to Candid Records and recorded another trio album, In Good Company, for them in 1994. He had a solo piano tour the following year and toured with Bud Shank. In addition to leading his own bands of various sizes, he has also done a lot of freelance playing. In the early to mid-2000s, he also recorded for Bright New Day, including one album with an orchestra.

Newton became a fellow of Leeds College of Music in 2003, where he is a principal lecturer in jazz piano.

Discography

As leader

As sideman
With Stacey Kent
1997: Close Your Eyes (Candid)
1999: Love Is...The Tender Trap (Candid)
2000: Let Yourself Go: Celebrating Fred Astaire (Candid)
2001: Dreamsville (Candid)
2002: In Love Again: The Music of Richard Rodgers (Candid)
2003: The Boy Next Door (Candid)

With Ray Gelato and Claire Martin
2016: We've Got a World That Swings (Linn)

Sources:

References

1958 births
Living people
Candid Records artists
Concord Records artists
Scottish jazz pianists
Alumni of Leeds College of Music
21st-century pianists